The Pink and White Terraces ( and ), were natural wonders of New Zealand. They were reportedly the largest silica sinter deposits on earth. Until recently, they were lost and thought destroyed in the 1886 eruption of Mount Tarawera, while new hydrothermal features formed to the south-west i.e. Waimangu Volcanic Rift Valley.

The Pink and White Terraces were formed by upwelling geothermal springs containing a cocktail of silica-saturated, near-neutral pH chloride water. These two world-famous springs were part of a group of hot springs and geysers, chiefly along an easterly ridge named Pinnacle Ridge (or the Steaming Ranges by Mundy). The main tourist attractions included Ngahapu, Ruakiwi, Te Tekapo, Waikanapanapa, Whatapoho, Ngawana, Koingo and Whakaehu.

The White Terraces were at the north-east end of Lake Rotomahana and faced west to north west at the entrance to the Kaiwaka Channel. The Pink Terraces lay four fifths of the way down the lake on the western shore, facing east to south-east. The pink appearance over the mid and upper basins (near the colour of a rainbow trout) was due to antimony and arsenic sulfides, although the Pink Terraces also contained gold in ore-grade concentrations.

Formation
The Pink and White Terraces were previously thought to be about 1,000 years old. The hydrothermal system which powered them may be up to 7,000 years old. The silica precipitation formed many pools and steps over time. Precipitation occurred by two methods. The ascending foundation over time formed a lip which would trap the descending flow and become level again. This process formed attractive swimming places, both for the shape and for the warm water. When the thermal layers sloped in the other direction away from the geyser, then silica steps formed on the surface. Both types of formation grew as silica-laden water cascaded over them, and the water also enhanced the spectacle. Geologist Ferdinand von Hochstetter wrote after his visit in 1859 that "doubtless thousands of years were required" for their formation.

Tourists preferred to bathe in the upper Pink Terrace pools due to their clarity and the range of temperature and depths.

History

One of the first Europeans to visit Rotomahana was Ernst Dieffenbach. He briefly visited the lake and terraces while on a survey for the New Zealand Company in early June 1841. The description of his visit in his book Travels in New Zealand inspired an interest in the Pink and White Terraces by the outside world.

The terraces became New Zealand's most famous tourist attraction, sometimes referred to as the Eighth Wonder of the World. New Zealand was still relatively inaccessible to Europeans and passage took several months by ship. The journey from Auckland was typically by steamer to Tauranga, the bridle track to Ohinemutu on Lake Rotorua, by coach to Te Wairoa (the home of the missionary the Reverend Seymour Mills Spencer), by canoe across Lake Tarawera, and then on foot or by canoe up and/or down the Kaiwaka Channel; over the hill to the swampy shores of Lake Rotomahana and the terraces.

Those who made the journey to the terraces were most frequently well-to-do, young male overseas tourists or officers from the British forces in New Zealand. The list of notable tourists included Sir George Grey in 1849, Alfred Duke of Edinburgh in 1869, and Victorian novelist Anthony Trollope in 1874.

The appearance of the terraces was recorded for posterity by a number of photographers, but as it was before colour photography was invented, their images lack the enticing colour the formations were known for. Several artists drew and painted the terraces before their loss in 1886, most notably Charles Blomfield who visited on more than one occasion. Their atmospheric views are the main record of the Eighth Wonder of the World. The colour chemistry of the Pink Terraces can be seen today at Waiotapu, where the Champagne Pool is lined with these same colloidal sulfides.

Sophia Hinerangi, sometimes known as Te Paea, took over as principal guide from the older Kate Middlemass in the early 1880s. She became recognised as the principal tourist guide of the Pink and White Terraces. Hinerangi observed the disturbances to Lake Tarawera water levels in the days preceding the eruption. In 1885, Alfred Warbrick began guiding, though he was not from Te Tuhourangi.

Lead up to loss
A number of people mapped and commented on the region before the loss of the terraces. No Māori maps are known. The first colonial sketch map of the lake was by Percy Smith in 1858. Ferdinand Hochstetter carried out the first topographic and geological survey of the Lake Rotomahana area in 1859, producing four maps of the lake while camped on its shore; culminating in his defining "Method of Squares" (or Grid) lake map of 30/4/1859. His lake research was later published in his Geographic and Geological survey where the formation of the terraces was also examined. A commissioned map by August Petermann was included in that work and this was considered valid until 2011 when Sascha Nolden discovered Hochstetter's original maps in Switzerland and repatriated them to New Zealand in digital form. In 2017 the Hochstetter and Petermann maps were compared and Petermann's map found defective. Hochstetter's 30/4/1859 map is now considered the more accurate map of Lake Rotomahana.

In 1873, Percy Smith climbed Mt. Tarawera and gave the impression that the mountain top was rough but showed no sign of volcanic vents.

High quality photographs of the terraces were available in Europe by 1875.

In March 1881, G. Seelhorst climbed Wahanga dome and the northern end of Ruawahia dome in search of a presumed "falling star" following reports of glowing and smoke from an area behind Wahanga.

Loss

On 10 June 1886, Mount Tarawera erupted. The eruption spread from west of Wahanga dome,  to the north, down to Lake Rotomahana. The volcano belched out hot mud, red hot boulders, and immense clouds of black ash from a  rift that crossed the mountain, passed through the lake, and extended beyond into the Waimangu valley.

After some years this filled with water to form a new Lake Rotomahana,  higher, ten times larger and deeper than the old lake.

Alfred Patchet Warbrick, a boat builder at Te Wairoa, witnessed the eruption of Mount Tarawera from Maunga Makatiti to the north of Lake Tarawera. Warbrick soon had whaleboats on Lake Tarawera investigating the new landscape; he in time became the chief guide to the post-eruption attractions. Warbrick never accepted that the Pink and White Terraces had been destroyed.

Rediscovery
The terraces were long thought to have been destroyed in the 1886 eruption. However, in February 2011, a team including researchers from GNS Science, Woods Hole Oceanographic Institution, Lamont–Doherty Earth Observatory, and Waikato University were mapping the lake floor when they reported discovering part of the Pink Terraces. A part of the White Terraces was also reported as rediscovered in June 2011. The announcement of the rediscovery of the White Terraces coincided with the 125th anniversary of the eruption of Mt. Tarawera in 1886.

The 2011 GNS claims of rediscovery were challenged by Bill Keir, a freelance researcher, who calculated that the 'rediscovered' structures were not where the terraces had been before the eruption. Keir speculated that the structures discovered by the GNS team were prehistoric terraces, never before seen by humans; or perhaps step-shaped objects created by the eruption. Keir's speculations were rebutted in detail by Cornel de Ronde, Principal Scientist, GNS Science. 

The GNS team went back in 2012, and again in February 2014, to photograph the remains. When their work was published in 2016 in the Journal of Volcanology and Geothermal Research, they drew back from earlier claims and reported the terraces were likely destroyed. In 2017 an article by Bill Keir in the Journal of the Royal Society of New Zealand stated that the terraces could not have survived intact.

In 2010, Sascha Nolden discovered Hochstetter's archive in Basel, Switzerland, and began progressively cataloging and publishing it. The archive includes Hochstetter's field diaries which contain the raw data from his compass survey of Lake Rotomahana and the Pink and White Terraces. These diaries include bearings which, when reverse-engineered, delivered the geographical coordinates of the Pink and White Terraces' locations. The Hochstetter diaries have been published in two research papers by Bunn and Nolden. This research led Bunn and Nolden to report that, contrary to the prevailing belief, the Pink and White Terraces were not submerged beneath Lake Rotomahana: they are instead buried  underground along the shoreline, based on coordinates in an article published in the Journal of the Royal Society of New Zealand, and could potentially be excavated and restored to public view. Any such excavation, however, would need the permission of the Māori tribe which owns the land. Bunn released a summary and supporting image gallery of the new 2018 findings. Later, he explained the release of the new findings.

, Tuhourangi Tribal Authority chairman Alan Skipworth was not yet convinced by Bunn and Nolden's claims, calling press reports that the Pink and White Terraces had been rediscovered "premature".

An article written by Bunn, Davies and Stewart, published in 2018, uses a novel "field of view" approach to navigate to the Pink and White Terraces locations. This draws on unpublished photography from Hochstetter's 1859 expedition, as well as his diary data.

A review article by de Ronde, Caratori Tontini, and Keam about the location of the Pink and White Terraces was published in 2018. The article also states that the data analysis confirms that the White Terraces would have been destroyed.

Similar places
Badab-e Surt in Iran
Hierve el Agua in Mexico
Mammoth Hot Springs at Yellowstone National Park in the United States
Pamukkale in Turkey
Terme di Saturnia in Italy

References

External links 
 Images and Paintings of the Pink and White Terraces in the collection of the Museum of New Zealand Te Papa Tongarewa
 Photos of the Pink & White Terraces
 Map of the Terraces on Te Ara: The Encyclopedia of New Zealand
 1885 picture of the White Terrace, Rotomahana from the Digital Collections of The New York Public Library

Rotorua Lakes District
Landforms of the Bay of Plenty Region
Okataina Volcanic Centre
Natural disasters in New Zealand
1886 in New Zealand
1886 eruption of Mount Tarawera
History of the Bay of Plenty Region
Rock formations of New Zealand
Hot springs of New Zealand
1886 disasters in New Zealand